The Last Word is a 1979 film starring Richard Harris. It was the last movie directed by Roy Boulting.

It was also known as The Number.

Plot
A washed-up inventor, Danny Travis, takes matters into his own hands in a very extreme way when he learns that his house will be condemned and his beloved children left on the street.

Travis is so upset that when a city official comes to evict him from the premises, he takes the man hostage. A television reporter, Paula Herbert, turns public sympathies both for and against Travis, prolonging the story opportunistically as a Los Angeles police captain, Gerrity, attempts to defuse the situation.

Cast
 Richard Harris as Danny Travis
 Karen Black as Paula Herbert
 Martin Landau as Capt. Gerrity
 Dennis Christopher as Ben 
 Christopher Guest as Roger
 Penelope Milford as Denise
 Penny Santon as Mrs. Tempino

References

External links

Films directed by Roy Boulting
1979 films
1970s English-language films
American comedy-drama films
1979 comedy-drama films
Films with screenplays by Michael Varhol
1970s American films